Duane Koslowski (born August 16, 1959) is an American wrestler. He competed in the men's Greco-Roman 130 kg at the 1988 Summer Olympics.

References

1959 births
Living people
American male sport wrestlers
Olympic wrestlers of the United States
Wrestlers at the 1988 Summer Olympics
People from Watertown, South Dakota
Pan American Games medalists in wrestling
Pan American Games gold medalists for the United States
Wrestlers at the 1987 Pan American Games
Medalists at the 1987 Pan American Games
20th-century American people
21st-century American people